The Evel Knievel Museum is a non-profit museum located in Topeka, Kansas, United States. The museum houses the largest collection of authentic Evel Knievel memorabilia in the world, including interactive experiences. The museum is located adjacent to Topeka’s Historic Harley-Davidson and opened in June 2017.

History  

It was established and founded by Mike Patterson, Lathan McKay and James Caplinger.

Evel Knievel's goal of having a museum honoring his legacy is over 40 years in the making. Evel Archaeology began in February 2012 as one man's quest to re-collect Knievel’s motorcycles, vehicles, wardrobe, artifacts, and personal effects to fully illustrate his cultural impact. In 2013 a mutual connection to rock and roll legend Jerry Lee Lewis and a Mack truck laid the foundation for the Evel Knievel Museum.

Frustrated with the lack of progress, Lathan McKay and Marilyn Stemp set out to find a new home for Knievel’s, Mack truck dubbed "Big Red" as the restoration had stalled in New Jersey. A then-current business partner made a phone call to Harley-Davidson dealer Mike Patterson of Topeka, Kansas, whose team of motorcycle restoration experts had recently completed a ground-up rebuilding of Jerry Lee Lewis's 1959 Panhead, which sold at auction for $350,000.

Patterson’s team had never restored a Mack truck but they had access to the expertise needed. Nearly 100 individuals signed on to resurrect the famous Mack. During the 18-month restoration Patterson, Mckay, and James Caplinger decided to take on an even bigger task. To build the world's first Evel Knievel Museum. Patterson built an addition to his Harley-Davidson dealership in Topeka to house the attraction.

The Evel Knievel museum was named one of the top 10 best new national attractions in 2017 by USA Today, and is officially authorized by the Knievel estate.

Founders and Personnel  

Mike Patterson is a former professional flat track racer and businessman. His Grandfather Henry purchased Topeka Harley-Davidson in March 1949. In 1975 his son Dennis joined him and carried on until the late 1980s when his nephew Mike entered the business. Making it three generations of Pattersons at the helm of the dealership.

Lathan McKay is an American historian, producer, entrepreneur, actor, and filmmaker. As a former professional skateboarder, he has amassed the largest collection of Evel Knievel memorabilia in the world.

James M. Caplinger was a self-made real estate developer, attorney, philanthropist, and business owner from Topeka, Kansas.

Museum Director: Bruce Zimmerman

Details
The 13,000-square-foot two story museum and Historic Harley Davidson dealership is located adjacent to the Kansas Expocenter at the corner of SW Topeka Boulevard and SW 21st Street. The winter hours are from 10am to 6pm Tuesdays-Saturdays. In the summer, the museum is also open from 12pm to 5pm on Sundays.

Besides exhibits, the museum site has a gift shop, barbecue restaurant, event space and Yesterday's museum. Also on site is Harley Town, which includes Touch of Class hair salon and Integrity insurance.

Knievel 

Robert Craig Knievel (October 17, 1938November 30, 2007), professionally known as Evel Knievel, was an American stunt performer and entertainer. Throughout his career, he attempted more than 75 ramp-to-ramp motorcycle jumps. A generation of kids grew up transfixed by his televised exploits, imitating his stunts on bicycles and with Evel Knievel toys.

Exhibits  

The Evel Knievel Museum chronicles Knievel’s life from his early years in Butte, Montana to the height of his fame in the 1970s. The time-lined exhibits are arranged in chronological order, with more than 1,000 artifacts on display, consisting of personal memorabilia, motorcycles, ephemera, and interactive exhibits. One example is the "4D Virtual Reality Jump" exhibit featuring Doug Danger, which allows visitors to experience Knievel’s stunt thrills first-hand but without the risks.

The museum is known for being the home to Knievel's 1974 Mack Truck & Trailer "Big Red", the star-spangled helmets and leathers, and numerous other artifacts, including:

 Knievel’s original jump bikes, performance leathers, helmets, and wardrobe
 Knievel’s world-famous Mack truck, “Big Red”
 Snake River Canyon Skycycle-X2
 Caesars Palace crash helmet
 Wembley Stadium crash helmet
 Viva Knievel screen used memorabilia
 Knievel’s famed flask-filled walking cane and jewelry
 Custom red Cadillac pickup truck
 Ideal Toy Company and licensing exhibit
 Personal effects such as family photographs, contracts, and letters
 1977 J. C. Agajanian special Evel Knievel Indianapolis race car
 Knievel’s first 1970 Harley-Davidson XR-750 iron head jump bike
 Interactive 4D virtual reality jump experience
 Interactive broken bones x-ray exhibit
 Interactive jump planner
 Evel Knievel movie theater
 Knievel’s crash car
 Knievel’s Harley Davidson Sportster trike

Recognition  

Upon completion the Evel Knievel Museum was named one of the Top 10 Best New Attractions in 2017 by USA Today. In April 2019 the museum received a Thea award from the Themed Entertainment Association for being one of the best new attractions in the United States.

References

External links 
 

Motorcycle museums in the United States
Museums in Topeka, Kansas
History museums in Kansas